Attorney General Archibald may refer to:

Frank C. Archibald (Vermont politician) (1857–1935), Attorney General of Vermont
Joseph Archibald (1934–2014), Attorney General of the British Virgin Islands
Samuel George William Archibald (1776–1846), Acting Attorney General for Nova Scotia

See also
Thomas Archbold (died 1488), Attorney General for Ireland